Neil Trevor Broom (born 20 November 1983) is a New Zealand international cricketer. Broom has played domestic cricket for teams including Otago Volts, Derbyshire County Cricket Club and Canterbury. After making his international debut in 2009, Broom was recalled in to the squad in 2017 following a successful domestic season, and made his Test debut.

His ODI comeback was strong, where he scored back to back knocks of 109* and 97 respectively against a top notch Bangladeshi bowling attack.

In July 2022, Broom was appointed coach of University Grange Cricket Club in the Dunedin Premier Grade competition (2022–23).

Domestic career
Broom signed a two-year deal with English domestic side Derbyshire County Cricket Club in August 2015. In June 2018, he was awarded a contract with Otago for the 2018–19 season. In June 2020, he was offered a contract by Otago ahead of the 2020–21 domestic cricket season.

International career
Broom was selected in the New Zealand squad for the One Day International series against the West Indies in 2008/09. He made his debut in the fourth match at Auckland. Broom's specialty is hitting the ball over the in field.
  
He also has been selected in the Chappell–Hadlee Trophy to play Australia in February 2009. During the first ODI in the series, he was wrongly given out, bowled by Michael Clarke, when video replays clearly showed that the wicket keeper Brad Haddin had clipped the bails with his gloves.

Comeback
In December 2016, Broom was named for the ODI series against Bangladesh after Ross Taylor was not passed fit after recovering from an eye surgery. At the time of his selection to the ODI series against Bangladesh, Broom already held a British passport, so he must terminate his contract with Derbyshire in order to play for New Zealand again. Broom scored his maiden ODI century against Bangladesh during the 2nd ODI of same series;where he along with Kane Williamson put on a solitary partnership of 176 for the second wicket, which is also the record second wicket partnership for New Zealand in ODIs and followed this up with 97 in the 3rd ODI. Following the ODI series against Bangladesh, he was added to New Zealand's Twenty20 International (T20I) squad, after Martin Guptill was ruled out due to injury.

In March 2017, he was included in New Zealand's Test squad against South Africa as a replacement for injured Ross Taylor. He made his Test debut for New Zealand against South Africa on 16 March 2017.

References

External links 

 
 

1983 births
Canterbury cricketers
Derbyshire cricketers
Living people
New Zealand cricketers
New Zealand Test cricketers
New Zealand One Day International cricketers
New Zealand Twenty20 International cricketers
Otago cricketers
South Island cricketers